Kalmasaari (also Kalmosaari) is an island in the lake Vuokkijärvi in Karelia. It is divided by the border between Russia and Finland. The island is located in the areas of Suomussalmi (Finland) and Kostomuksha (Russia). On both sides, it is part of the border zone and is off-limits to the general public.

Kalmasaari was used as a cemetery by the Eastern Orthodox villages of Kuivajärvi, Hietajärvi and Vuokinsalmi until 1922 when the Finland–Russia border was determined. A new cemetery was established to the Kalmisaari island of lake Kuivajärvi, 4 kilometres west of Kalmasaari.

The Russian name of Kalmasaari is ″Раясаари″, which is a transliterated version of Finnish word ″Rajasaari″ meaning ″Border Island″.

References 

Uninhabited islands of Finland
Uninhabited islands of Russia
International islands
Finland–Russia border